Moesdorf is a small town in the commune of Mersch, in central Luxembourg.  , the town has a population of 335.

Notable people
 Jerry Weyer (born 1986), politician, activist, and lawyer

Mersch
Towns in Luxembourg